Aleksandr Ivanovich Shmurnov (born December 8, 1966; Moscow, RSFSR, USSR) is a Russian sports journalist, radio host, television commentator, who worked for the Russian Match TV channel until 2022. Former chief editor of a sports Internet portal  Championat.com. The creator of the training center  Sports journalist.

Biography 
Born on December 8, 1966 in Moscow. He graduated from the French special school No. 18 (currently 1275), then the Moscow Aviation Institute. Working in sports journalism since 1992.

In 1992-1993 he was the editor and host of a sports broadcast on the radio station  Business Wave. In 1993-2001 he was the author, columnist, and editor of the international department of the weekly Football, in 1995 he was one of the leading software Football Review on  Ostankino  Channel. In 1994, he was among the first journalists of NTV sports  editorial. Getting up before a choice, continued to work in the  Football, which until then was anxious to get there. In 2001–2009 years - the browser, then the chief of the sports newspaper  Gazeta. In 2009-2010, the publisher of the  Encyclopedia of World Football.  From 2011 to 2014 - chief editor of the sports internet portal  Championat.com.

Since 2003 to 2015, he was the commentator of TV Company NTV Plus. Basically commented football games. In 2003-2004 he led the author's program of fan organizations  Evrofanklub of NTV Plus Football. Also I worked for many years on the channel  Tennis, covered all the Grand Slam tournaments, the matches of the Davis Cup and Fed Cup. He worked as a commentator for cycling at the Olympic Games in 2008. Spent the last editions of the football talk show  90 minutes+  instead of Georgy Cherdantsev.
The main tool for TV commentator considers relevant and emotional reaction to the actions of the players. In particular, he said:

Since November 2015 worked as a commentator of football, as well as the leading documentary series  Everything for Euro!  and the UEFA Europa League on TV viewing Match TV. Since March 2016 leads a program overview  8-16 on the TV channel  Nash Football.

He left Match Tv in March 2022.

Aleksandr Shmurnov is married and has three children. Is a fluent in French and Spanish.

References

External links
 Большое интервью 
 Школа Спортивной Журналистики

1966 births
Living people
Russian television journalists
Russian association football commentators
Russian sports journalists